Jaks, Jåks or Jakš is the surname of:

 Iver Jåks (1932–2007), Sami Norwegian artist
 Jānis Jaks (born 1995), Latvian ice hockey player
 Martin Jakš (born 1986), Czech cross country skier
 Pauli Jaks (born 1972), Swiss retired ice hockey goaltender
 Peter Jaks (1966–2011), Swiss ice hockey player